Andrea Bang (born May 2, 1989) is a Canadian actress and screenwriter from Burnaby, British Columbia. She is best known for playing  Janet Kim in the CBC comedy Kim's Convenience, for which she was nominated three times at the Canadian Screen Awards. She has appeared in A Million Little Things, Fresh and Running with Violet.

Background
Bang was born in Burnaby, British Columbia to Korean immigrant parents. Her sister, Diana Bang, is also an actress and writer. Bang attended Burnaby North Secondary School, was in the chorus in a school production of Bye Bye Birdie.

Bang graduated in 2012 with a degree in Psychology from University of British Columbia, while also taking acting lessons. In 2017, she told the Vancouver Sun: 
Bang's parents, who had immigrated from Korea, initially found it "distressing" that Andrea and her sister Diana had chosen to pursue acting as a career, but have since become fully supportive.

Career
In 2015, Bang won a best actress (Summer Award) at the Asians on Film Festival for her debut movie performance as Francesca in the short film Playdate. In 2016, Bang landed the main role of Janet Kim in the CBC comedy Kim's Convenience alongside Paul Sun-Hyung Lee, Jean Yoon and Andrew Phung.

In 2020, Bang received a nomination at the Canadian Screen Awards for Best Supporting Performance in a Web Program or Series for her role as Samantha in Running with Violet.

Filmography

Writing

Awards and nominations

References

External links
 
 

Living people
21st-century Canadian actresses
Actresses from British Columbia
Canadian actresses of Korean descent
Canadian film actresses
Canadian television actresses
People from Burnaby
University of British Columbia alumni
1989 births